Richard Spanbauer (March 5, 1946) is a Wisconsin politician, legislator, and businessman.

Born in New York City, Spanbauer graduated from Oshkosh High School in 1963 and served in the United States Marine Corps reserve from 1963 to 1969. Spanbauer went to Fox Valley Technical College and is a manufacturer and retailer in Oshkosh, Wisconsin. Spanbauer served as chairman of the Algoma Town Board from 2001 to 2009 He served in the Wisconsin Assembly from January 2009 until he retired in January 2013.

Notes

1946 births
Living people
Politicians from Oshkosh, Wisconsin
Politicians from New York City
Businesspeople from Wisconsin
Military personnel from Wisconsin
Mayors of places in Wisconsin
Republican Party members of the Wisconsin State Assembly
21st-century American politicians